The Party of Democratic Progress (abbr. ПДП, PDP) is a centre to centre-right Serb political party in Bosnia and Herzegovina founded on 26 September 1999. It is the third-largest party in Republika Srpska entity.

History
The PDP was established in Banja Luka on 26 September 1999. During the founding assembly, Mladen Ivanić was elected as the president of the party, while Branko Dokić and Zoran Đerić were elected as vice presidents. On 28 November 2015, Ivanić left the position of president after 16 years, after which Branislav Borenović became the new president of PDP.

International Cooperation
The party is an observer member of the European People's Party (EPP) and International Democrat Union (IDU).

In terms of bilateral cooperation with other European parties, PDP maintains strong links with the Conservative Party (UK), Moderate Party (Sweden), Christian Democratic Union (Germany), SDKU (Slovakia), Austrian People's Party, New Democracy (Greece) and Democratic Party of Serbia from Serbia.

PDP also has good relations with Konrad Adenauer Foundation, Robert Schuman Institute and Democrat Youth Community of Europe.

List of presidents

Electoral results

Parliamentary elections

Presidential elections

Positions held
Major positions held by Party of Democratic Progress members:

References

External links
Official website

Political parties in Republika Srpska
Serb political parties in Bosnia and Herzegovina
International Democrat Union member parties
Conservative parties in Bosnia and Herzegovina
1999 establishments in Bosnia and Herzegovina
Political parties established in 1999
Pro-European political parties in Bosnia and Herzegovina